National Route 128 is a national highway of Japan connecting Tateyama, Chiba and Chūō-ku, Chiba in Japan, with a total length of 131.6 km (81.77 mi). Its northernmost point is at geographic co-ordinates:35.550978,140.349827 and its southernmost at:34.993371,139.869347.

References

128
Roads in Chiba Prefecture